Andreas Kolset Stjernen (born 30 July 1988) is a Norwegian retired ski jumper. He is the son of former ski jumper Hroar Stjernen.

Career
He made his debut in the Continental Cup in February 2005 in Brotterode, scoring two 49th places over two days. His first time among the top thirty occurred in March 2006 in Bischofshofen when he finished 28th, and his first time among the top ten occurred in March 2009 in Trondheim when he finished eighth. He made his World Cup debut in December 2009 in Lillehammer and collected his first World Cup points by finishing 19th. His personal best is 249 meters set in Vikersund on 14 February 2016.
Stjernen won the 2017–18 FIS Ski Flying World Cup, becoming the first Norwegian to achieve this feat.

He represented the sports club Sprova IL and Trønderhopp, and lives in Levanger.

World Cup results

Standings

Individual wins

References

External links
 
 
 

1988 births
Living people
Norwegian male ski jumpers
People from Levanger
FIS Nordic World Ski Championships medalists in ski jumping
Olympic ski jumpers of Norway
Ski jumpers at the 2018 Winter Olympics
Medalists at the 2018 Winter Olympics
Olympic gold medalists for Norway
Olympic medalists in ski jumping
Sportspeople from Trøndelag
21st-century Norwegian people